Brammer Grocery Store is a historic building located in the West End of Davenport, Iowa, United States. The building was listed on the National Register of Historic Places in 1983. The two-story, brick, Greek Revival style building is an example of a traditional local house form adapted to small-scale commercial use. It features a plain façade, a diamond-shaped light in the gable, and keystones over the second floor windows. John Brammer opened Brammer and Son, a grocery store, in this building in 1885. He joined with Louis Ott in 1895 and they added hardware and paint to their offerings. The store was renamed Brammer and Ott. The building has subsequently housed other business ventures over the years.

References

Commercial buildings completed in 1885
Greek Revival architecture in Iowa
Buildings and structures in Davenport, Iowa
Commercial buildings on the National Register of Historic Places in Iowa
National Register of Historic Places in Davenport, Iowa
Retail buildings in Iowa
Grocery store buildings